Fire, Bed, and Bone by Henrietta Branford is a historical novel for older children set at the time of the Peasants' Revolt. It was published by Walker Books in 1997. Branford won the annual Guardian Children's Fiction Prize, a once-in-a-lifetime book award judged by a panel of British children's writers.

Walker's North American division Candlewick Press published the first U.S. edition in 1998.

Plot summary
The story is narrated by a nameless hunting dog, as witness to the English Peasants' Revolt of 1381. She does her best to survive while trying to raise her own puppy Fleabane after the others were brutally mauled to death by a wild cat, tracking her captive owners Rufus and Comfort as they are tried for heresy.  Branford's martianist technique (see Craig Raine) creates a more primal narrative voice in contrast with the suspected response of the reader, but themes including maternal affection and honour unite man and dog.

One catalog summary:
 "In 1381 in England, a hunting dog recounts what happens to his beloved master Rufus and his family when they are arrested on suspicion of being part of the peasants' rebellion led by Wat Tyler and the preacher John Ball."

Awards
Beside winning the Guardian Prize, Branford was a commended runner up for the annual Carnegie Medal from the Library Association, recognising the year's best children's book by a British subject. Fire, Bed, and Bone also made the Kliatt Editors' Choice and Voice of Youth Advocates Non Fiction Honor List.

See also
 List of peasant revolts
 Consequences of the Black Death

Notes

References

External links 
 —immediately, first US edition 

1997 British novels
1997 children's books
British children's novels
Walker Books books
Children's historical novels
Children's novels about animals
Fiction set in the 1380s
Guardian Children's Fiction Prize-winning works
Novels about dogs
Novels set in the 14th century